Jacopo Fo (born 31 March 1955) is an Italian writer-actor and director. He is the son of playwrights Franca Rame and Dario Fo.

His 1992 book Lo Zen e l'arte di scopare (Zen and the Art of Fucking) sold more than 70,000 copies. It formed the basis of the 1994 monologue Sesso? Grazie, tanto per gradire! (Sex? Thanks, Don't Mind If I Do!), which Jacopo Fo worked on with his father and mother, featuring educational pieces on topics such as AIDS, contraception, sex education and sexual repression. The government of Silvio Berlusconi, recently risen to power, banned Italians under the age of 18 from seeing it over fears, it said, that the play could "cause offence to the common decency which requires respect for spheres of decency, and provoke distress among adolescent spectators, with possible effects on their behaviour in relation to sex", thus defeating the original purpose of the performance. Much free publicity ensued, with the censorship issue being debated in the national parliament, teachers calling for it to be performed, and audiences and both Italian and foreign intellectuals signing a petition calling for the ban to be overturned.

Jacopo Fo has in more recent times been prominent in the political campaign of Beppe Grillo.

Works 
 Il biforcuto. Dizionario di humour, violenza, sesso, politica e altre cose, Milan, Ottaviano, 1975.
 Se ti muovi ti stato!, prefazione di Giovan Battista Lazagna, Milan, Ottaviano, 1975.
 Fare il comunismo senza farsi male. La presa del potere e la manutenzione dello zen, Perugia, L'Altra Editrice, 1981.
 Andare a cavallo senza farsi male, Sommacampagna, Demetra, 1992. .
 Diventare dio in 10 mosse. Manuale pratico di comicoterapia, Bussolengo, Demetra, 1993. .
 Lo zen e l'arte di scopare, Bussolengo, Demetra, 1993. .
 Il karamè. Lo zen e l'arte di spaccare la faccia agli imbecilli, con Massimo Capotorto, Sommacampagna, Demetra, 1993. .
 La vera storia del mondo. Sesso, merda, generali e professori imbecilli. Falsi e censure nei libri di testo, Sommacampagna, Demetra, 1993. .
 Sulla naturale superiorità della donna, Bussolengo, Demetra, 1994. .
 Lo zen e l'arte di scopare 2. Pulizia finale, Bussolengo, Demetra, 1994. .
 Fatture, tarocchi e malocchi, Bussolengo, Demetra, 1994. .
 Come fare il buddista senza farsi male. Manuale di illuminazione zen ad uso dei viandanti, Bussolengo, Demetra, 1994. .
 Parlare l'inglese come Toro Seduto, Bussolengo, Demetra, 1995. .
 L'enciclopedia del sesso sublime, 4 voll., con 5 VHS, Bresso, Hobby & Work, 1996. .
 Cervelli verdi fritti, Bussolengo, Demetra, 1996. .
 '68. C'era una volta la rivoluzione. I dieci anni che sconvolsero il mondo, con Sergio Parini, Milan, Feltrinelli, 1997. .
 Guarire ridendo. La medicina che non ha bisogno di ticket, Milan, Mondadori, 1997. .
 Mamme zen, con Monica Traglio, Bussolengo, Demetra, 1997. .
 Dio c'è e vi saluta tutti, Milan, Mondadori, 1998. .
 La grande truffa delle piramidi. Le piramidi non le hanno costruite né i faraoni né i marziani!, Scritto, Nuovi mondi, 1998.
 Il diavolo ha i piedi per terra, Scritto, Nuovi mondi, 1999. .
 La scopata galattica, Scritto, Nuovi mondi, 1999. .
 Gesù amava le donne e non era biondo (Tutto quello che non ti dicono al catechismo), Scritto, Nuovi mondi, 1999. .
 Ti amo, ma il tuo braccio destro mi fa schifo, tagliatelo! Storia della stupidità dalla Bibbia a oggi, Milan, Mondadori, 1999. .
 La dimostrazione chimica dell'esistenza di Dio, Scritto, Nuovi mondi, 2000. .
 Il mio angelo custode si è suicidato, con Davide Rota, Scritto, Nuovi mondi, 2000. .
 Il libro nero del Cristianesimo, con Sergio Tomat e Laura Malucelli, Scritto, Nuovi mondi, 2000. ; 2005. .
 Il computer per negati totali assoluti, con Alberto Cioca, con CD-ROM, Scritto, Nuovi mondi, 2000. .
 Schiave ribelli, con Laura Malucelli, Scritto, Nuovi mondi, 2000. .
 Operazione pace, con Laura Malucelli, San Lazzaro di Savena, Nuovi mondi, 2001. .
 Il calzino che non puzza. La sogliola che finge l'orgasmo e altre meraviglie, San Lazzaro di Savena, Nuovi mondi, 2002. .
 22 cose che la sinistra deve fare e non ha ancora fatto, con Dario Fo e Franca Rame, San Lazzaro di Savena, Nuovi mondi, 2002. .
 Ho 14 anni e non sono una stronza San Lazzaro di Savena, Nuovi mondi, 2003. .
 Olio di colza e altri 30 modi per risparmiare, proteggere l'ambiente e salvare l'economia italiana, Roma, Nuova iniziativa editoriale, 2005.
 La società dei desideri, Edizioni Jacopo Fo, 2006. .
 Per nessuna ragione al mondo, Edizioni Jacopo Fo, 2006. .
 Morbide Galassie, Edizioni Jacopo Fo, 2006. 
 Napoli nel sangue, Napoli, Voce delle Voci, 2006.
 Olio di colza, Palermo, Flaccovio, 2007. .
 Non è vero che tutto va peggio. Come e perché il mondo continua a migliorare anche se non sembra, con Michele Dotti, Bologna, EMI, 2008. .
 Pannelli solari gratis. [Come produrre energia senza un investimenti iniziale, un manuale per il risparmio energetico fatto in casa], Palermo, Flaccovio, 2008. .
 Salvare l'ambiente conviene, Modena, Nuovi mondi, 2008. .
 La corretta manutenzione del maschio, Parma, Guanda, 2009. .
 Yoga demenziale. Il manuale definitivo della rivoluzione pigra, Roma, Fazi, 2009. .
 Distruggete la Masanto!, Edizioni Jacopo Fo, 2010. .
 Colora gli animilli, Edizioni Jacopo Fo, 2010. .
 L'operaia nuda, il diavolo e la rivoluzione!!! Le avventure di Toni Barra investigatore privato per conto del sindacato metalmeccanici, Edizioni Jacopo Fo, 2010. .
 L'erba del diavolo. [Vietare le droghe ingrassa la criminalità organizzata e fa aumentare i tossicodipendenti. Informare è meglio che reprimere], con Nina Karen, Palermo, Flaccovio, 2011. .
 Angese. Il guerriero divertente. Breve biografia quasi autorizzata, Edizioni Jacopo Fo, 2012. .
 Perché gli svizzeri sono più intelligenti, con Rosaria Guerra, Siena, Barbera, 2014. .

Further reading

References 

1955 births
Living people
Italian male actors
Italian male writers
Artists from Rome